Belassunu  was an Assyrian princess of Karana(modern day Tell al-Rimah).

History
Belassunu was the daughter of Samu-addu, King of Karana, perhaps by his wife Ama-duga, and she was sister to Queen Iltani, wife of the usurper King Aqba-Hammu. Details of Belassunu's life are known from surviving letters from the former royal archive at Tell-el-Rimah. She was the wife of Abdu-Suri to whom she bore children. The assertion that Belassunu had been a secondary wife to Zimrilim, king of Mari has now been proved incorrect.

While residing in the city of Karana she was the recipient of royal rations of meat and oil, and she paid visits to the cities of Mari and Andariq. Eventually she retired to her father's court at Karana, being escorted there under the protection of her brother-in-law Aqba-Hammu.

References
 B.F. Batto, Women at Mari (1974)

18th-century BC women
Ancient princesses
Ancient Assyrians
Ancient Mesopotamian women
18th-century BC people